Miloš Šćepanović (born October 9, 1982) is a Montenegrin water polo player. He was a member of the Montenegro men's national water polo team at the 2008 Summer Olympics. There the team reached the semifinals, where it was defeated by Hungary and then met Serbia in the bronze medal match. They were defeated with the score 6:4 for Serbia and finished in 4th place.

He was also a member of the Montenegrin team at the 2012 Summer Olympics.  Montenegro again reached the semi-finals, losing to Croatia, and then were again defeated by Serbia in the bronze medal match.  The score was 12:11 for Serbia.

See also
 Montenegro men's Olympic water polo team records and statistics
 List of men's Olympic water polo tournament goalkeepers
 List of World Aquatics Championships medalists in water polo

References
 juegosmediterraneos

External links
 

1982 births
Living people
Montenegrin male water polo players
Water polo goalkeepers
Olympic water polo players of Montenegro
Water polo players at the 2008 Summer Olympics
Water polo players at the 2012 Summer Olympics
World Aquatics Championships medalists in water polo
Mediterranean Games bronze medalists for Serbia
Competitors at the 2005 Mediterranean Games
Mediterranean Games medalists in water polo
Mediterranean Games bronze medalists for Montenegro
Competitors at the 2018 Mediterranean Games
Galatasaray S.K. (men's water polo) players